Porthecla minyia is a butterfly in the family Lycaenidae. It is found in the Amazon basin and the Guianas at altitudes between 100 and 1,000 meters.

The length of the forewings is 16.2 mm for males and 15.1 mm for females. Adults are on wing in August and December. They feed on the nectar of Cordia schomburgkii.

References

Butterflies described in 1867
Eumaeini
Lycaenidae of South America
Taxa named by William Chapman Hewitson